Walter Ulbrich (15 June 1910 – 13 November 1991) was a German film producer primarily known for writing and/or producing 10 of 16 four-part adventure mini-series made for West German TV in the 1960s and 1970s. Mostly based on classics of world literature such as Robinson Crusoe or The Sea Wolf, these West German/French co-productions traditionally premiered on West German public-service television in December and are therefore also known as Weihnachtsvierteiler (Christmas four-parters). The series have been dubbed into a variety of languages and also became popular outside Germany, especially in France, the UK, and Canada.

His work and influence on European TV productions

As a writer, Ulbrich saw scriptwriting as an important process and tried to make sure his productions were true to the books, yet at the same time exciting. The latter sometimes necessitated including plots or characters from other novels or inventing them outright, which has garnered his adaptations some criticism. Because a script had to be arrived at that satisfied both German and French production partners, the scriptwriting stage could be lengthy, and so in the case of Two Years' Vacation it took four years from first draft to airing, because of script development as well as financial problems (on the French side).

Differences between e.g. the English, German, and French versions of a series often comprised more than just a different dub and titles: e.g. Two Years' Vacation has different scores (German score by Hans Posegga, French score by Alain Le Meur) and the German cut adds an extended introduction set in Peru that shows the—purely MacGuffin—gold treasure being stolen, but misses a few scenes at the end where the youths are reunited with their families. Also, the German version has narration by the character Dick Sand as an adult, which brings out some of the elements of the story which Ulbrich perceived as class warfare. The French cut lacks that added social comment. Generally, the German versions tend to focus more on action scenes (because they were also intended for prime-time adult audiences) and have more experimental/contemporary-sounding scores than their French counterparts.

On 27 April 1970 Ulbrich founded his own production company, Tele München Gruppe (TMG), which is still active today. In 1980, Concorde Filmverleih was founded as a distributor.

Ulbrich's productions were all done in cooperation with the ZDF public-service television channel and other international partners, especially from France and Romania. Their success prompted the other German public-service channel ARD to emulate the formula, leading to adventure series such as Huckleberry Finn and His Friends (1979/80) and Captain James Cook (1987). Ulbrich may not have invented international TV co-productions, but his series demonstrated the feasibility of high-quality TV productions using an eclectic mix of nationalities in front and behind the camera.

Selected filmography
5 June (1942)
Under the Bridges (1945)
 Where the Trains Go (1949)
Seven Years in Tibet (1956)
Rose Bernd (1957)
The Goose of Sedan (1959)

Four-parters with Ulbrich as writer and/or producer

W: as writer, P: as producer

Ulbrich also re-edited the French-produced  (1973, 16 mm, starring Jean Marais) for German TV, renaming it to Cagliostro, reducing its running time from 360 minutes to 255 minutes, and changing the plot substantially.

See also

The Adventures of Robinson Crusoe (TV series)

References

 Oliver Kellner and Ulf Marek: Seewolf & Co. – Die großen Abenteuervierteiler des ZDF, Schwarzkopf & Schwarzkopf, 2005.

External links

Tele München Gruppe official web site

1910 births
1991 deaths
German film producers
People from Metz
People from Alsace-Lorraine
German male writers